Giovanni Scelzi (born November 28, 2001) is an American racing driver. He currently competes full-time in the World of Outlaws Nos Energy Drink Sprint Car series driving the #18 sprint car for KCP Racing.

Racing career
Scelzi began his career in the micro-sprint ranks, driving at Plaza Park Raceway. Racing at Lemoore Speedway as a nine-year-old, Scelzi posted 24 wins during that season.

At age sixteen, Scelzi moved from his hometown of Fresno, California to Indianapolis, Indiana to be closer to sprint car competition. In September of that year, he became the youngest winner in World of Outlaws history, winning a preliminary event at the National Open at Williams Grove Speedway in Pennsylvania.

In 2019, Scelzi became the youngest driver to win a feature at Knoxville Raceway, using the highest groove on the racetrack to take the lead. He also won his first career United States Auto Club midget race, taking the checkered flag at Placerville Speedway.

Scelzi started his 2020 season by racing at the Chili Bowl in Tulsa, Oklahoma. On January 13, Scelzi announced a partnership with Guy Forbrook to run a limited number of sprint car races in the Midwest United States, saying that he wanted to scale back his sprint car efforts for the year. On January 14, Scelzi was confirmed for a full ARCA Menards Series West schedule for Bill McAnally Racing, driving the organization's No. 16 entry. A midwinter trip to Australia to race sprint cars was cancelled when Scelzi left Indy Race Cars, the team he drove for in 2018 and 2019, to join Forbrook. He won his first Pro Late Model race at New Smyrna Speedway on February 9, capitalizing on a last lap crash/penalty combination that took the top two cars out of contention. In June, Scelzi returned to his family sprint car team for some All Star Circuit of Champions races and also joined Tucker Boat Motorsports for some sprint car races during Indiana Midget Week. Scelzi scored a career-best ARCA West finish of second at the Las Vegas Motor Speedway Bullring in September. In the following race, Scelzi executed a bump-and-run maneuver on Taylor Gray during the penultimate lap to claim his first ARCA win.

In 2023, Scelzi will join the World of Outlaws full time. He will go after Rookie of the Year honors with the World of Outlaws.

Personal life
Gio is the son of former drag racing driver Gary Scelzi, and is the younger brother of sprint car driver Dominic Scelzi. He attended Clovis Online High School in a blended learning model with in-person and online instruction.

Motorsports career results

ARCA Menards Series
(key) (Bold – Pole position awarded by qualifying time. Italics – Pole position earned by points standings or practice time. * – Most laps led.)

ARCA Menards Series East

ARCA Menards Series West

References

Living people
2001 births
Racing drivers from California
Racing drivers from Fresno, California
Sportspeople from Fresno, California
ARCA Menards Series drivers
World of Outlaws drivers